Édouard Roger-Vasselin (born 28 November 1983) is a French professional tennis player who primarily specialises in doubles.

He won his first Grand Slam title at the 2014 French Open, winning the men's doubles partnering Julien Benneteau, and also finished runner-up at the Wimbledon Championships in both 2016 and 2019, alongside Benneteau and Nicolas Mahut respectively. Roger-Vasselin reached his career-high doubles ranking of world No. 6 in November 2014, and has won 24 doubles titles on the ATP Tour, including the 2015 Cincinnati Masters with Daniel Nestor.

In singles, his highest ranking was world No. 35, achieved in February 2014, and he finished runner-up at the 2013 Delray Beach Open and 2014 Chennai Open. Roger-Vasselin's best Grand Slam result in singles was reaching the third round at the French Open and Wimbledon Championships in 2007, and the 2014 Australian Open. He is the son of 1983 French Open semifinalist Christophe Roger-Vasselin.

Career

2007
At the French Open, he reached the third round as a wildcard, after a second-round victory against Radek Štěpánek in five sets, 3–6, 6–1, 0–6, 6–4, 6–4. He also reached the third round at Wimbledon, beating 24th seed Juan Ignacio Chela in straight sets along the way, and made the top 100 for the first time as a result. On 16 July 2007, he reached a career-best ranking of 82.

2009
At the Japan Open, he advanced through the qualifying draw to set up a first round match with 2009 US Open champion Juan Martín del Potro. Ranked No. 189 at the time, Roger-Vasselin stunned the world No. 5, 6–4, 6–4. The match was Roger-Vasselin's first ATP Tour level victory of the season. Roger-Vasselin then defeated Austrian Jürgen Melzer to advance to the third round, where he lost to former world No. 1, Lleyton Hewitt, in straight sets.

2012

In 2012, Roger-Vasselin had considerable success on the ATP Tour in doubles. He won tournaments in Montpellier, Marseille, and Metz, all partnered with Nicolas Mahut. He also made it to the quarterfinals at Wimbledon for the first time teamed with James Cerretani. They were defeated by the eventual champions Jonathan Marray and Frederik Nielsen in five sets.

2013
At the Delray Beach International Championships, Roger-Vasselin defeated four opponents including top seed John Isner to reach his first ATP tournament final. He lost to Ernests Gulbis for the title. In doubles, he won two titles, at the Hall of Fame Classic in Newport, Rhode Island, partnering Nicolas Mahut and in Atlanta, partnering Dutchman Igor Sijsling.

He made the semifinals in doubles at Wimbledon, partnering Rohan Bopanna.

Vasselin made a breakthrough in the indoor part of the season when he has reached semifinals of the ATP 500 event in Basel, upsetting home favorite Stan Wawrinka in the first round. He lost to Juan Martín del Potro, after winning the first set. He finished the year a career-high No. 53.

2014: French Open doubles champion
Roger-Vasselin had a good beginning to his singles campaign, reaching the final in Chennai (lost to Wawrinka). He reached the quarterfinals in Montpellier and Marseille, losing to Jerzy Janowicz and Jo-Wilfried Tsonga, respectively. He also reached the quarterfinals on grass in Eastbourne, losing to Denis Istomin. The rest of his singles season was relatively disappointing.

He and doubles partner Julien Benneteau, however, had a very successful season. They reached the semifinals in Sydney, being eliminated by Daniel Nestor and Nenad Zimonjić. At the Australian Open, they went down in the round of 16 to Max Mirnyi and Mikhail Youzhny. They had another semifinal showing in Rotterdam, losing to Jean-Julien Rojer and Horia Tecău.

The pair won the title in Marseille in February, beating Paul Hanley and Jonathan Marray in the final. Another quarterfinal followed in Acapulco, where they lost to Treat Huey and Dominic Inglot. Then, they went out in the round of 16 in both Indian Wells and Miami. The pair made another quarterfinal, this time at a Masters 1000 event, in Monte Carlo, losing to the Bryan brothers. They followed this up with a semifinal appearance in Nice.

The highlight of his year and his career was the 2014 French Open, which he and Benneteau won against the Spanish pair of Marcel Granollers and Marc López.

On grass, they made the semifinals of the Queen's Club tournament, losing to Jamie Murray and John Peers. They followed this up with a quarterfinal appearance at Wimbledon, where they lost to the French pair of Michaël Llodra and Nicolas Mahut.

On the hard-court North American swing, they reached the quarterfinals (l. to Nestor and Zimonjić) in Toronto, and the semifinals in Cincinnati (l. to Vasek Pospisil and Jack Sock).

In Shanghai, they reached the final, losing again to the Bryan brothers.

2015: Maiden Masters 1000 doubles title

2016–2020: Two time Wimbledon and ATP finals doubles finalist

2022: Fifth Masters 1000 final in five years 
At Indian Wells, Roger-Vasselin and partner Santiago Gonzáles advanced to the finals of the Masters 1000 series event, losing to John Isner and Jack Sock. In doing so, Roger-Vasselin became just the second player to reach a Masters 1000 final after major hip surgery. Roger-Vasselin, who had hip surgery last year, joins Bob Bryan in this select category. Both Roger-Vasselin and Gonzáles and the Bryan Brothers were coached by Dave Marshall during those runs.

Significant finals

Grand Slam finals

Doubles: 3 (1 title, 2 runner-ups)

Mixed doubles: 1 (runner-up)

Year-end championships

Doubles: 1 (1 runner-up)

Masters 1000 finals

Doubles: 5 (1 title, 4 runner-ups)

ATP Tour career finals

Singles: 2 (2 runner-ups)

Doubles: 41 (24 titles, 17 runner-ups)

ATP Challenger and ITF Futures finals

Singles: 16 (7–9)

Doubles: 33 (18–15)

Performance timeline

Singles

1Held as Hamburg Masters until 2008, Madrid Masters (clay) 2009–present.
2Held as Madrid Masters (hardcourt) until 2008, and Shanghai Masters 2009–present.

Doubles

Mixed doubles

References

External links
 
 

1983 births
Living people
People from Gennevilliers
French male tennis players
French Open champions
Grand Slam (tennis) champions in men's doubles
Sportspeople from Hauts-de-Seine